Dadkhoda-ye Sasuli (also Romanized as Dādkhodā-ye Sāsūlī; also known as Dādkhodā-ye Golmīr) is a village in Dust Mohammad Rural District, in the Central District of Hirmand County, Sistan and Baluchestan Province, Iran. At the 2006 census, its population was 430, in 84 families.

References 

Populated places in Hirmand County